Pacific County is a county in the U.S. state of Washington. As of the 2020 census, the population was 23,365. Its county seat is South Bend, and its largest city is Raymond. The county was formed by the government of Oregon Territory in February 1851 and is named for the Pacific Ocean.

Pacific County is centered on Willapa Bay, a region that provides twenty-five percent of the United States oyster harvest, although forestry, fishing, and tourism are also significant elements of the county's economy.

History
The area that is now Pacific County was part of Oregon Territory in the first part of the nineteenth century. On December 19, 1845, the Provisional Government of Oregon created two counties (Vancouver and Clark) in its northern portion (which is now the state of Washington). In 1849, the name of Vancouver County was changed to Lewis County, and on February 4, 1851, a portion of Lewis County was partitioned off to become Pacific County. The county's boundaries have not changed since its creation. The unincorporated community of Oysterville, established in 1852, was the first county seat. The county records were stolen from Oysterville and ferried across Willapa Harbor by residents of South Bend, resulting in that town becoming the new county seat in 1893.

Geography

Geographic features
Cape Disappointment
Columbia River
Long Beach Peninsula
Long Island
Willapa Bay

Major highways
 U.S. Route 101
 State Route 6

Adjacent counties
Grays Harbor County – north
Lewis County – east
Wahkiakum County – southeast
Clatsop County, Oregon – south

National protected areas
 Lewis and Clark National Historical Park (part)
 Willapa National Wildlife Refuge

Demographics

2000 census
As of the census of 2000, there were 20,984 people, 9,096 households, and 5,885 families living in the county. The population density was 22 people per square mile (9/km2). There were 13,991 housing units at an average density of 15 per square mile (6/km2). The racial makeup of the county was 90.54% White, 0.20% Black or African American, 2.44% Native American, 2.08% Asian, 0.09% Pacific Islander, 1.83% from other races, and 2.82% from two or more races. 5.01% of the population were Hispanic or Latino of any race. 18.0% were of German, 10.8% English, 8.8% Irish and 8.6% United States or American ancestry.

There were 9,096 households, out of which 23.10% had children under the age of 18 living with them, 53.10% were married couples living together, 7.90% had a female householder with no husband present, and 35.30% were non-families. 29.50% of all households were made up of individuals, and 14.30% had someone living alone who was 65 years of age or older. The average household size was 2.27 and the average family size was 2.77.

In the county, the population was spread out, with 21.40% under the age of 18, 6.00% from 18 to 24, 21.20% from 25 to 44, 28.90% from 45 to 64, and 22.60% who were 65 years of age or older.  The median age was 46 years. For every 100 females there were 98.30 males.  For every 100 females age 18 and over, there were 95.80 males.

The median income for a household in the county was $31,209, and the median income for a family was $39,302. Males had a median income of $33,892 versus $22,982 for females. The per capita income for the county was $17,322. About 9.10% of families and 14.40% of the population were below the poverty line, including 19.70% of those under age 18 and 8.10% of those age 65 or over.

2010 census
As of the 2010 census, there were 20,920 people, 9,499 households, and 5,707 families living in the county. The racial makeup of the county was 87.4% white, 2.3% American Indian, 2.0% Asian, 0.4% black or African American, 0.1% Pacific islander, 4.4% from other races, and 3.4% from two or more races. Those of Hispanic or Latino origin made up 8.0% of the population. In terms of ancestry, 23.4% were German, 13.8% were English, 11.9% were Irish, 7.6% were American, 6.2% were Norwegian, and 5.8% were Swedish.

Of the 9,499 households, 20.7% had children under the age of 18 living with them, 47.6% were married couples living together, 8.1% had a female householder with no husband present, 39.9% were non-families, and 33.0% of all households were made up of individuals. The average household size was 2.17 and the average family size was 2.72. The median age was 50.8 years.

The median income for a household in the county was $39,642 and the median income for a family was $51,450. Males had a median income of $44,775 versus $34,538 for females. The per capita income for the county was $23,326. About 12.4% of families and 16.8% of the population were below the poverty line, including 20.4% of those under age 18 and 9.9% of those age 65 or over.

Politics
Pacific County, along with neighboring Grays Harbor County, were among the most consistently Democratic counties in the nation. In 2016 and 2020 however, the county, like Grays Harbor County, broke its long streak of backing the Democratic candidate for president, voting for the Republican candidate.

Communities

Cities
Ilwaco
Long Beach
Raymond
South Bend (county seat)

Census-designated places
Bay Center
Chinook
Lebam
Naselle
Ocean Park
Tokeland
Willapa

Unincorporated communities

Dexter by the Sea
Firdale
Frances
Holcomb
Menlo
Megler
Nemah
North Cove
Oceanside
Old Willapa
Oysterville
Pluvius
Seaview
Surfside

See also
Ilwaco Railway and Navigation Company
National Register of Historic Places listings in Pacific County, Washington
Steamboats of Willapa Bay
Astoria-Megler Ferry

References

External links
Pacific County, official county site

 
1851 establishments in Oregon Territory
Populated places established in 1851
Western Washington